39 i pół (39 and a half) is a Polish comedy-drama television series that appeared on TVN for three seasons from March 4, 2008 through December 1, 2009. The series tells the story about Darek (Tomasz Karolak), a man just before his 40th birthday who wants go back to his wife and teenage son.

Cast

Main characters
 Tomasz Karolak as Darek Jankowski, former amateur musician
 Daria Widawska as Anna Jankowska, Darek's wife
 Alan Andersz as Patryk Jankowski, Darek's son
 Magdalena Lamparska as Marta Jankowska, Patryk's wife
 Sonia Bohosiewicz as Paula, Anna's neighbor
 Krzysztof Stelmaszyk as Tomasz Ostoja, Anna's fiance
 Dorota Deląg as Kasia Cichocka, Darek's ex-girlfriend and boss

Episodes

External links
Official website 
39 i pół at distribution.tvn.pl 
Full episodes of 39 i pół at Onet VOD 

Polish comedy-drama television series